Carryover with steam, in steam technology, refers to transport of moisture and impurities with steam.

The moisture carryover with steam is quantified by the mass flow rate of liquid water per mass flow rate of steam.  In boilers producing saturated steam, it is typically about 0.1% but may increase with fouling and boiler impurities.

The carryover of impurities (for example, sodium, chloride, copper, silica) with steam can be divided into two parts:
 mechanical carryover of the impurity with liquid water droplets entrained with the steam, and
 vaporous carryover of the impurity in steam.

The total carryover is a sum of the mechanical and vaporous carryover. The vaporous carryover generally increases with increasing steam pressure. In low pressure boilers, the mechanical carryover of impurities prevails, possibly with the exception of more volatile impurities, like silica.

The impurity carryover can cause corrosion and fouling of steam turbines, reheaters, and superheaters.

See also 
 Priming

References 

Boilers